The Parramatta River is an intermediate tide-dominated, drowned valley estuary located in Sydney, New South Wales, Australia. Secondary tributaries include the smaller Lane Cove and Duck rivers.

Formed by the confluence of Toongabbie Creek and Darling Mills Creek at North Parramatta, the river flows in an easterly direction to a line between Yurulbin in Birchgrove and Manns Point in Greenwich.

The land adjacent to the Parramatta River was occupied for many thousands of years by Aboriginal peoples of the Wallumettagal nations and the Wangal, Toongagal (or Tugagal), Burramattagal, and Wategora clans of the Darug people. They used the river as an important source of food and a place for trade. The river was formed 15 to 29 million years ago as its waters began to cut a valley into sandstone and shale.

Inflowing waterways
The headwaters of the Parramatta River are formed by the confluence of Darling Mills Creek and Toongabbie Creek. The point of the confluence lies on the northern border of the grounds of Cumberland Hospital. It also lies on the boundary of the suburbs of Westmead, Northmead, and  North Parramatta.

Waterways flowing into the Parramatta River, westtoeast include:
 Vineyard Creek at Rydalmere, from the north
 Ponds Subiaco Creek at Rydalmere, from the north
 Duck River at Silverwater, from the south
 Archer Creek at Meadowbank, from the north
 Smalls Creek at Meadowbank, from the far north
 Charity Creek at Meadowbank, from the north
 Haslams Creek at Homebush Bay, from the south
 Powells Creek at Homebush Bay, from the south
 Iron Cove Creek at Five Dock, from the south
 Hawthorne Canal at Iron Cove, from the south
 Tarban Creek at Huntleys Point, from the north
 Lane Cove River at Greenwich, from the north

The river in Parramatta
From its start at the confluence of Toongabbie Creek and Darling Mills Creek at North Parramatta, the river flows in a southerly direction through the grounds of Cumberland Hospital. Entering Parramatta Park, it then turns east and flows through the Parramatta CBD. Both banks are largely open to the public, with parkland and walkways, downstream to James Ruse Drive. The river is fed by a number of small creeks and stormwater drains.

The waters are controlled by a series of weirs: the weir at the edge of the hospital grounds, the Kiosk Weir in Parramatta Park, the Marsden Street Weir, and the Charles Street Weir at the ferry wharf. The weirs have been equipped with fish ladders. Kiosk Weir and Charles Street Weir also include footbridges enabling a crossing of the river. Historically, the river was dammed to provide reservoirs for the town. Currently, however, the function of the weirs is aesthetic, preventing the water from draining away during dry periods. As a consequence the river floods in heavy rain, particularly at the Charles Street Weir. The Charles Street Weir forms the boundary between fresh water and salt water, and is also the limit of tides.

River governance

The whole of Sydney Harbour including its tributary rivers is subject to a long range Catchment Management Plan. The Government has almost eliminated local representation by eliminating the former local catchment management boards.

The New South Wales Government has a documented policy in relation to access to the harbour and river foreshores, including public access to intertidal lands where landowners have absolute waterfronts but where the waterfront is exposed at low tide. Moorings and jetties are the responsibility of Transport for NSW, who are also responsible for the management of the Harbour and river seabed. Many bays contain swing moorings, mostly privately owned, but some associated with commercial marinas.

Along the Parramatta River many hands have made lighter work, in the community-wide effort to make the entire river swimmable again by 2025, starting with the opening of Lake Parramatta in 2014.
Thirteen councils sit within the Parramatta River catchment group and all have committed to tackling the two major polluters: sewer overflows and stormwater.

Transport

Ferry services and wharves

There are River Cat services along the Parramatta River to Circular Quay. The main wharves, westtoeast are:

Crossings

The Parramatta River, along with Sydney Harbour, is the most significant waterway in Sydney. Since settlement, the river and the harbour have presented a formidable barrier between the earlyEuropean settled southern Farm Cove precinct, to development north of the waterway. Together, Parramatta River and Port Jackson literally cut Sydney in half along its northsouth axis.

As a result, the many crossings are extremely important to the life of the city. From westtoeast, the crossings of the Parramatta River are located at:

Ecological and environment

Water quality concerns

Until 1970 the river was an open drain for Sydney's industry and consequently the southern central embayments are contaminated with a range of heavy metals and chemicals. The Northern Bays are less affected as the Sydney Harbour Bridge was not completed until 1932 and so industrial development was already well established on the southern side of the Harbour.

Dr Gavin Birch of the University of Sydney has published a number of papers which show that Sydney Harbour is as contaminated as most other harbours in industrialised cities, that the main sediment contamination is in the southern central embayments (Blackwattle to Homebush Bays), that there are five particularly contaminated areas of Sydney Harbour, and that four of them are in the Parramatta river system.

The main contaminated areas of the Parramatta River are:
 Homebush Bay - dioxins, lead, phthalates, DDT, PAHs (coal tars) mainly originating from nearby chemical factories of Berger Paints, CSR Chemicals, ICI/Orica, and Union Carbide.
 Iron Cove - various metals and chemicals with no clearly defined point source. Pollution may possibly enter through Iron Cove Creek and Hawthorne Canal.
 Adjacent to the former AGL site, now redeveloped as Breakfast Point.

Water quality is monitored by the Office of Environment and Heritage (New South Wales) (OEH) for faecal coliforms and e. coli, but only as far west as Cabarita. OEH does not monitor water quality further west on the river, despite increasing development and the use of the river for recreational boating. In the areas monitored, the water quality is generally acceptable except after heavy rains.

Fishing
The Parramatta River is subject to a number of fishing bans because of its contaminated sediments. There is a complete fishing ban in Homebush Bay because of the dioxin contamination. In 2006 the NSW Government imposed a complete commercial fishing ban throughout the rest of Sydney Harbour and its tributaries, including the Parramatta River west of the Harbour Bridge, which remained in place until 2011.

The Parramatta River is one of the few significant coastal rivers in New South Wales which has not been the subject of an investigation by the Healthy Rivers Commission. The Cooks River and Botany Bay have been subject to such an investigation. Some have campaigned for a Healthy Rivers Commission inquiry to bring together all the information on the state of the river and its sediments and fish and assist in watershed management.

Major wetlands and environmentally sensitive areas
Major wetlands include:
 Bicentennial Park Wetlands (nationally significant, JAMBA CAMBA)
 Newington Wetlands (nationally significant, JAMBA CAMBA)

There are significant stands of mangroves along the river west of Henley (on the river's northern shore) and Mortlake (on the river's southern shore) and in the Lane Cove River. The mangroves have actually colonised areas that were previously salt marsh. Research into historical drawings and writings indicates that the mangroves were far fewer at English colonisation. Council information panels in Glades Bay explain that the bay's now extensive mangrove stands would once have been open water, sandy beaches and outcrops of rock. Land clearing and development has allowed soil and various nutrients to be washed into the river. This has provided an ideal environment for mangroves to colonise. The excessive siltation of the river is an ongoing problem.

Reclamation
Many areas of the river, particularly the swampy heads of bays, have been reclaimed, often being used as rubbish dumps before being converted into playing fields. Large sections of Meadowbank Park were created in this manner. Some industrial sites were also reclaimed heavily from the river, particularly in Homebush Bay. Most creeks leading into the bays have been channelised (lined with concrete walls and floor).

Remediation
While some areas of the river with heavily contaminated sediments have not been remediated, there is significant remediation of sediments about to start in Homebush Bay. These include the dioxin contaminated sediments near the former Union Carbide plant and the lead contaminated sediments near the former Berger Paints plant. The former AGL site has been analysed, a remediation plan developed and approved, remediation completed and construction commenced on medium to high density residential development, but the sediments, which independent research shows to be contaminated with pollutants from the AGL operations, have not yet had the investigation stage finalised.

Other areas have had sediments covered with concrete to prevent the fish eating the benthos. Some of these companies claim that the contamination is best left alone, but environmentalists have argued that the contamination could be being passed up the food chain and claim that the companies are trying to avoid the costs incurred in pollution cleanup.

Recreational activities

Sailing
There are a number of sailing and yachting clubs on the River:
Abbotsford 12 ft Flying Squadron in Abbotsford
Concord & Ryde Sailing Club at Putney
Parramatta River Sailing Club at Gladesville

Sailing and rowing take place under an aquatic licence granted annually by Roads and Maritime Services.

Sea Scouts
There are Sea Scouts at:
 Rhodes: First Yaralla
 Meadowbank: Epping Scout Group has a boat shed at 150 Bowden Street, next to the public ferry wharf, and in the summer uses it for sailing and canoeing activities

Rowing
The river has a long historical association with rowing.  There is a monument in honour of Henry Searle, a champion sculler of his day, in the river at Henley.

Some of the school rowing sheds are:
 MLC School
 The King's School
 Sydney Boys High School
 Newington College
 The Scots College
 Sydney Grammar School
 Shore School

There are also a number of rowing clubs:
 Leichhardt Rowing Club, Drummoyne Rowing Club and UTS Haberfield  within Iron Cove.
 Glebe Rowing Club in Blackwattle Bay.
 Sydney Rowing Club at Abbotsford Point.
 Balmain Rowing Club at Balmain
 UNSW Boat Club in Tarban Creek.
 SGHS Rowing Club also in Tarban Creek

While a number of regattas are still held on the river each year, mainly in Iron Cove and Hen and Chicken Bay, many of the major regattas are now held at the Sydney International Regatta Centre (SIRC), adjacent to the Nepean River, where rowing was held for the 2000 Summer Olympics. Early GPS Schoolboy Head of the River races were held on the Parramatta River before moving to the Nepean River and later SIRC.

Most rowing training is done in the middle to upper reaches of the river between Abbotsford and Homebush Bay because there is less water traffic and therefore less waves and more protection from wind. Rowing also takes place in the Lane Cove River and Iron Cove which have less traffic.

Foreshore walks and cycleways
Much of the foreshore is still in the hands of industry and private individuals as residences, however there is an increasing amount of waterfront land available as foreshore reserve with walkways and cycleways. As former industrial sites undergo remediation and redevelopment, the foreshores are opened up for public access. Where there is no foreshore access, cycleways are routed through quiet residential streets with clearly marked sections of the road reserved for cyclists.

Major foreshore parks include:
 Cabarita Park
 Kissing Point Park, Ryde
 Meadowbank Park
 Putney Park
 George Kendall Riverside Park, Ermington
 Bicentennial Park, Homebush Bay
 Millennium Parklands, Homebush/Auburn

Heritage items
Major heritage buildings, all listed on the Register of the National Estate, on or near the foreshore include:
 Thomas Walker Convalescent Hospital (now Rivendell Child, Adolescent and Family Unit), was designed by Sir John Sulman and built in 1891–93.
 Callan Park, a former psychiatric hospital, with fine sandstone buildings designed by James Barnet in 1877.
 Gladesville Mental Hospital, with sandstone buildings in park-like surroundings, designed by Mortimer Lewis in 1836.
 Yaralla, the Italianate mansion of Thomas Walker and his daughter Dame Eadith Walker, generous benefactors of the Concord community, now functions as Dame Eadith Walker Hospital. It was built in the late 1860s, with later extensions by Sir John Sulman.
 Newington House, a Regency home built in 1832 by John Blaxland. In 1863, the property was acquired by the Wesleyans and turned into Newington College. In 1887 it became part of Silverwater State Hospital, and later became an administrative block in Silverwater Correctional Complex.

Gallery

See also 

 List of rivers of New South Wales (L-Z)
 Rivers of New South Wales
 Geography of Sydney 
 Guide to Sydney Rivers site

References

External links

 
The Parramatta River Catchment Group
Parramatta River at the NSW Office of Environment and Heritage website
Sydney Harbour and Parramatta River Catchment map at the NSW Office of Environment and Heritage website
The Upper Parramatta River Catchment Trust
Information on proposed remediation at Homebush Bay and the Rhodes peninsula
  [CC-By-SA]

 

 
Rivers of Sydney